Tatiana Alcántara known as Tati Alcántara is a Peruvian actress, dancer, choreographer, singer, model & entrepreneur. She currently runs her own dance academy called "ESCENI-K".

Career 
In 2004 played Sandra Luna in the teen telenovela Besos Robados. In May 2009 she participated in the play Cabaret, as Lulu. The following year she starred alongside Marco Zunino, the musical Rent, as Mimi. In June 2011 she participated in the musical West Side Story.

In September 2011 two programs involved in the dance reality show El Gran Show, replacing Maricielo Effio. Two months later participate in El Gran Show (2011): Reyes del Show.

In May 2012 she will play Velma Kelly in the musical Chicago.

Theatre

Filmography

References
 In Spanish:

External links
 

Living people
Peruvian female dancers
Peruvian female models
Art educators
Dance teachers
Peruvian women in business
21st-century Peruvian women singers
21st-century Peruvian singers
Peruvian musical theatre actresses
Peruvian film actresses
Peruvian television actresses
Singers from Lima
Year of birth missing (living people)
21st-century Peruvian actresses